The Roper-Corbet was an English automobile manufactured from 1911 until 1913 and sold by the London and Parisian Motor Co Ltd.  Its maker is not known. A four-cylinder, 2412 cc 14/16 hp model was exhibited at the London motor show in 1911. It was advertised for £350 complete.

See also
 List of car manufacturers of the United Kingdom

References
David Burgess Wise, The New Illustrated Encyclopedia of Automobiles.

Defunct motor vehicle manufacturers of the United Kingdom